

Portugal
 Angola – José de Oliveira Barbosa, Governor of Angola (1810–1816)

Spanish Empire
Viceroyalty of New Spain – Félix María Calleja del Rey, conde de Calderón, Viceroy of New Spain (1813–1816)
Captaincy General of Cuba – Juan Ruíz de Apodaca, Governor of Cuba (1812–1816)
Spanish East Indies – José de Gardoqui Jaraveita, Governor-General of the Philippines (1813–1816)
Captaincy General of Santo Domingo – Carlos de Urrutia y Montoya, Governor of Santo Domingo (1813–1819)
Viceroyalty of Peru – José Fernando Abascal y Sousa, marqués de la Concordia, Viceroy of Peru (1806–1816)
Captaincy General of Chile – 
Mariano Osorio, Governor and Captain-General of Chile (1814–1815)
Francisco Casimiro Marcó del Ponte Angel-Díaz y Méndez, Governor and Captain-General of Chile (1815–1818)

British Empire
Berbice – Henry William Bentinck, Lieutenant Governor of Berbice (1814–1820)
Cayman Islands – William Bodden, Chief Magistrate of the Cayman Islands (1776–1823)
Ceylon – Robert Brownrigg, Governor of Ceylon (1812–1820)
 Malta Colony – Thomas Maitland, Governor of Malta (1813–1824)
New South Wales – Lachlan Macquarie, Governor of New South Wales (1810–1821)

Colonial governors
Colonial governors
1815